Kimberlite is an igneous rock and a rare variant of peridotite. It is most commonly known to be the main host matrix for diamonds. It is named after the town of Kimberley in South Africa, where the discovery of an  diamond called the Star of South Africa in 1869 spawned a diamond rush and the digging of the open-pit mine called the Big Hole. Previously, the term kimberlite has been applied to olivine lamproites as Kimberlite II, however this has been in error.

Kimberlite occurs in the Earth's crust in vertical structures known as kimberlite pipes, as well as igneous dykes. Kimberlite also occurs as horizontal sills. Kimberlite pipes are the most important source of mined diamonds today. The consensus on kimberlites is that they are formed deep within the mantle. It is this depth of melting and generation that makes kimberlites prone to hosting diamond xenocrysts.

Despite its relative rarity, kimberlite has attracted attention because it serves as a carrier of diamonds and garnet peridotite mantle xenoliths to the Earth's surface. Its probable derivation from depths greater than any other igneous rock type, and the extreme magma composition that it reflects in terms of low silica content and high levels of incompatible trace-element enrichment, make an understanding of kimberlite petrogenesis important. In this regard, the study of kimberlite has the potential to provide information about the composition of the deep mantle and melting processes occurring at or near the interface between the cratonic continental lithosphere and the underlying convecting asthenospheric mantle.

Morphology and volcanology 

Many kimberlite structures are emplaced as carrot-shaped, vertical intrusions termed "pipes". This classic carrot shape is formed due to a complex intrusive process of kimberlitic magma, which inherits a large proportion of CO2 (lower amounts of H2O) in the system, which produces a deep explosive boiling stage that causes a significant amount of vertical flaring. Kimberlite classification is based on the recognition of differing rock facies. These differing facies are associated with a particular style of magmatic activity, namely crater, diatreme and hypabyssal rocks.

The morphology of kimberlite pipes and their classical carrot shape is the result of explosive diatreme volcanism from very deep mantle-derived sources. These volcanic explosions produce vertical columns of rock that rise from deep magma reservoirs. The eruptions forming these pipes fracture the surrounding rock as it explodes, bringing up unaltered xenoliths of peridotite to surface. These xenoliths provide valuable information to geologists about mantle conditions and composition. The morphology of kimberlite pipes is varied, but includes a sheeted dyke complex of tabular, vertically dipping feeder dykes in the root of the pipe, which extends down to the mantle. Within  of the surface, the highly pressured magma explodes upwards and expands to form a conical to cylindrical diatreme, which erupts to the surface. The surface expression is rarely preserved but is usually similar to a maar volcano. Kimberlite dikes and sills can be thin (1–4 meters), while pipes range in diameter from about 75 meters to 1.5 kilometers.

Two Jurassic kimberlite dikes exist in Pennsylvania.  One, the Gates-Adah Dike, outcrops on the Monongahela River on the border of Fayette and Greene Counties. The other, the Dixonville-Tanoma Dike in central Indiana County, does not outcrop at the surface and was discovered by miners. Similarly aged kimberlite is found in several locations in New York.

Petrology 

Both the location and origin of kimberlitic magmas are subjects of contention. Their extreme enrichment and geochemistry have led to a large amount of speculation about their origin, with models placing their source within the sub-continental lithospheric mantle (SCLM) or even as deep as the transition zone. The mechanism of enrichment has also been the topic of interest with models including partial melting, assimilation of subducted sediment or derivation from a primary magma source.

Historically, kimberlites have been classified into two distinct varieties, termed "basaltic" and "micaceous" based primarily on petrographic observations. This was later revised by C. B. Smith, who renamed these divisions "group I" and "group II" based on the isotopic affinities of these rocks using the Nd, Sr and Pb systems.  Roger Mitchell later proposed that these group I and II kimberlites display such distinct differences, that they may not be as closely related as once thought. He showed that group II kimberlites show closer affinities to lamproites than they do to group I kimberlites. Hence, he reclassified group II kimberlites as orangeites to prevent confusion.

Group I kimberlites 

Group-I kimberlites are of CO2-rich ultramafic potassic igneous rocks dominated by primary forsteritic olivine and carbonate minerals, with a trace-mineral assemblage of magnesian ilmenite, chromium pyrope, almandine-pyrope, chromium diopside (in some cases subcalcic), phlogopite, enstatite and of Ti-poor chromite. Group I kimberlites exhibit a distinctive inequigranular texture caused by macrocrystic to megacrystic phenocrysts of olivine, pyrope, chromian diopside, magnesian ilmenite, and phlogopite, in a fine- to medium-grained groundmass.

The groundmass mineralogy, which more closely resembles a true composition of the igneous rock, is dominated by carbonate and significant amounts of forsteritic olivine, with lesser amounts of pyrope garnet, Cr-diopside, magnesian ilmenite, and spinel.

Olivine lamproites 

Olivine lamproites were previously called group II kimberlite or orangeite in response to the mistaken belief that they only occurred in South Africa. Their occurrence and petrology, however, are identical globally and should not be erroneously referred to as kimberlite. Olivine lamproites are ultrapotassic, peralkaline rocks rich in volatiles (dominantly H2O). The distinctive characteristic of olivine lamproites is phlogopite macrocrysts and microphenocrysts, together with groundmass micas that vary in composition from phlogopite to "tetraferriphlogopite" (anomalously Al-poor phlogopite requiring Fe to enter the tetrahedral site). Resorbed olivine macrocrysts and euhedral primary crystals of groundmass olivine are common but not essential constituents.

Characteristic primary phases in the groundmass include zoned pyroxenes (cores of diopside rimmed by Ti-aegirine), spinel-group minerals (magnesian chromite to titaniferous magnetite), Sr- and REE-rich perovskite, Sr-rich apatite, REE-rich phosphates (monazite, daqingshanite), potassian barian hollandite group minerals, Nb-bearing rutile and Mn-bearing ilmenite.

Kimberlitic indicator minerals 

Kimberlites are peculiar igneous rocks because they contain a variety of mineral species with chemical compositions that indicate they formed under high pressure and temperature within the mantle. These minerals, such as chromium diopside (a pyroxene), chromium spinels, magnesian ilmenite, and pyrope garnets rich in chromium, are generally absent from most other igneous rocks, making them particularly useful as indicators for kimberlites.

These indicator minerals are generally sought in stream sediments in modern alluvial material. Their presence may indicate the presence of a kimberlite within the erosional watershed that produced the alluvium.

Geochemistry 

The geochemistry of Kimberlites is defined by the following parameters:
 ultramafic, MgO >12% and generally >15%;
 ultrapotassic, molar K2O/Al2O3 >3;
 near-primitive Ni (>400 ppm), Cr (>1000 ppm), Co (>150 ppm);
 REE-enrichment;
 moderate to high large-ion lithophile element (LILE) enrichment, ΣLILE = >1,000 ppm;
 high H2O and CO2.

Economic importance 

Kimberlites are the most important source of primary diamonds. Many kimberlite pipes also produce rich alluvial or eluvial diamond placer deposits. About 6,400 kimberlite pipes have been discovered in the world, of those about 900 have been classified as diamondiferous, and of those just over 30 have been economic enough to diamond mine.
 
The deposits occurring at Kimberley, South Africa, were the first recognized and the source of the name. The Kimberley diamonds were originally found in weathered kimberlite, which was colored yellow by limonite, and so was called "yellow ground". Deeper workings encountered less altered rock, serpentinized kimberlite, which miners call "blue ground". Yellow ground kimberlite is easy to break apart and was the first source of diamonds to be mined. Blue ground kimberlite needs to be run through rock crushers to extract the diamonds.

See also Mir Mine and Udachnaya pipe, both in the Sakha Republic, Siberia.

The blue and yellow ground were both prolific producers of diamonds. After the yellow ground had been exhausted, miners in the late 19th century accidentally cut into the blue ground and found gem-quality diamonds in quantity. The economic situation at the time was such that, with a flood of diamonds being found, the miners undercut each other's prices and eventually decreased the diamonds' value down to cost in a short time.

Related rock types

References

Further reading

 
 Edwards, C. B., Howkins, J. B., 1966. Kimberlites in Tanganyika with special reference to the Mwadui occurrence. Econ. Geol., 61:537-554.
 
 Nixon, P. H., 1995.  The morphology and nature of primary diamondiferous occurrences.  Journal of Geochemical Exoloration, 53: 41–71.
 
 Woolley, A. R., Bergman, S. C., Edgar, A. D., Le Bas, M. J., Mitchell, R. H., Rock, N. M. S., Scott Smith, B. H., 1996. Classification of lamprophyres, lamproites, kimberlites, and the kalsilitic, melilitic, and leucitic rocks. The Canadian Mineralogist, Vol 34, Part 2. pp. 175–186.

External links

 Kimberlite image gallery. Retrieved 2012-02-10.

Ultrapotassic rocks
Ultramafic rocks
Subvolcanic rocks
Economic geology
Diamond
Kimberley, Northern Cape